Claudius James Francis (born 1959) is a Saint Lucian television talk show host and politician, who has been Speaker of the House of Assembly since 2021.  He was President of the Senate from 2012 to 2016.  Francis is the former chairman of the Saint Lucia Labour Party.

Francis is the host of Straight Up with Claudius Francis on HTS Channel 4.

References 

Living people
Presidents of the Senate of Saint Lucia
Speakers of the House of Assembly of Saint Lucia
Television talk show hosts
1959 births
Saint Lucia Labour Party politicians